Giovanna d'Aragona (1502–1575) was a patron of the arts, printers and religious reform in Naples during the Renaissance.

Family
She was the oldest daughter of Duke Ferdinando of Malteno and Castellana de Cardona. Her father was a younger son of Ferdinand I of Naples. After her marriage, Vittoria Colonna became her sister-in-law.

Life
Her parents had fled to the island Ischia after French troops had overrun Naples. Constanza d'Avalos resided here as well and gathered a literary circle around her. Amongst them was the poet Vittoria Colonna, the wife of Constanza's nephew. In 1521, Giovanna married Vittoria's brother Ascanio. Upon marriage they became Duke and Duchess of Tagliacozzo. After giving birth to six children, she took them with her to Ischia and left her husband. Despite this, she became close again to Vittoria and together with Giovanna's sister Maria and Constanza d'Avalos, they supported Juan de Valdés. She married Ascannio Colonna and had children: one was Girolama Colonna, who became an ancestor the Avellino family.

She refused to return to her husband, but did try to intercede for him when he refused to pay salt tax to the pope. In spite of her mediation, the pope's forces attacked Ascanio's lands and he was imprisoned by an envoy of Charles V.

When Pope Paul IV held Giovanna hostage in 1556, she escaped by wearing servants' clothes and fled to Naples with her children and servants. Since she had long been a patron of writers, the pope's treatment of her caused a lot of indignation, especially amongst printers and writers in Venice. In 1560, after the death of Paul IV, she returned to Rome and became a prominent figure in Italy's political and religious life.

The poet Girolamo Ruscelli paid tribute to her in an anthology with work from many contemporary Italian poets.

Notes

References
 
 

1502 births
1575 deaths
16th-century Italian nobility
Giovanna
Italian art patrons
Italian literature patrons
16th-century Neapolitan people
Nobility from Naples
16th-century Italian women